City Streets is the 14th album by American singer-songwriter Carole King, released in 1989. It was her first album after six-year hiatus from her recording career, co-produced by Rudy Guess who supported her as a backing guitarist in later years.

The title track features a guitar solo by Eric Clapton. It was released as a single and became a Top 20 hit in the US Billboard Adult Contemporary chart. Clapton also played the guitar on "Ain't That the Way". Another notable guest musician is Branford Marsalis, who played the saxophone on "Midnight Flyer".

Before making a comeback record, King fostered an acting career. "I Can't Stop Thinking About You" is a collaboration work with actor Paul Hipp, who co-starred with her in the off-Broadway show A Minor Incident in 1988. "Midnight Flyer" and "Someone Who Believes in You" were co-written by her former songwriting partner and husband Gerry Goffin. The latter was originally written for Air Supply vocalist Russell Hitchcock. His interpretation was initially featured on his eponymous solo debut released in 1987, and he remade the song on Air Supply's album The Earth Is..., four years later. It was also covered by Martha Wash in 1993 on her solo album.

Like her other efforts released in the 1980s, City Streets received mixed critical reviews and resulted in a commercial flop, reaching only #111 on the Billboard album chart. The album has been out of print worldwide since 1993, although a reissue was once planned by American Beat Records in 2007.

Track listing

Personnel 
 Carole King – lead vocals, backing vocals (1-4, 6-8), synthesizers (1-3), rhythm guitar (2), acoustic piano (3, 7), keyboards (4, 6, 8-10), Hammond organ (7)
 Robbie Kondor – synthesizers (2, 4, 6, 9, 10), acoustic piano (5), Hammond organ (6, 8)
 Teddy Andreadis – acoustic piano (6)
 Eric Clapton – lead guitar (1), guitar (7)
 Rudy Guess – rhythm guitar (1, 2), lead guitar (2), guitar (3, 4, 6, 8, 9), electric guitar (5), mandolin (8)
 Mark Bosch – acoustic guitar (5), electric guitar (5)
 Paul Hipp – acoustic guitar (5), backing vocals (5)
 Wayne Pedzwater – bass (1, 2, 5-10)
 Seth Glassman – bass (3, 4)
 Steve Ferrone – drums (1, 3, 6, 7, 9)
 Max Weinberg – drums (2)
 Omar Hakim – drums (5, 8), cymbal (10)
 Jimmy Bralower – tambourine (1, 8), cowbell (2), timpani (3), electronic drums (4), percussion (4)
 Sammy Figueroa – percussion (3, 6, 7, 9, 10)
 Michael Brecker – saxophone (1)
 Jimmy Roberts – saxophone (5)
 Branford Marsalis – saxophone (8)
 Nick Lane – trombone (5)
 Jimmy Zavala – harmonica (8)
 Richard Hardy – flute (10)
 Heidi Berg – backing vocals (9)
 Angela Capell – backing vocals (9)
 Kacey Cisyk – backing vocals (9)
 Sherry Goffin – backing vocals (9)

Production 
 Producers – Carole King and Rudy Guess 
 Executive Producer – Tom Whalley
 Recorded and Mixed by James Farber at Skyline Studios (New York, NY).
 Second Engineer – Eugene "UE" Nastasi
 Mastered by Greg Calbi at Sterling Sound (New York, NY).
 Art Direction – Tommy Steele
 Design – Jeffrey Fey
 Photography – Caroline Grayshock

Chart positions

References

1989 albums
Carole King albums
Priority Records albums